Icinga is an open-source computer system and network monitoring application. It was originally created as a fork of the Nagios system monitoring application in 2009.

Icinga is working to improve the Nagios' development process, as well as adding new features such as a modern Web 2.0 style user interface, additional database connectors (for MySQL, Oracle, and PostgreSQL), and a REST API that lets administrators integrate numerous extensions without complicated modification of the Icinga core.

The Icinga developers also seek to reflect community needs more closely and to integrate patches more quickly. The first stable version, 1.0, was released in December 2009, and the version counter had risen every couple of months as of January 2010.

The name Icinga is a Zulu word meaning "it looks for", "it browses" or "it examines" and is pronounced with a click consonant.

History 
In May 2009 a group of developers from the Nagios community announced the fork Icinga, citing their dissatisfaction with the stagnant development of the Nagios software at the time and their desire to open its development to a broader base.

In their first year, Icinga developers released separate versions of Core, API and Web, and celebrated their 10,000th download.

In its second year, the Icinga project released unified and stable Core and Web; added dual-stack IPv6 / IPv4 support, optimized database connectivity and revamped the Icinga Web user interface, integrating various community add-ons (PNP4Nagios, LConf, Heatmap and Business Process Addon). The project achieved more than 70,000 downloads and grew to 23 team members.

In their second year, Icinga celebrated their 100,000th download, integrated the Icinga API component into Icinga Web; improved SLA reporting; and extended the Icinga virtual appliances to the Debian, OpenSUSE and CentOS operating systems.

In October 2012 the Icinga project released a technology preview of a core framework replacement and parallel development branch, Icinga 2. The developers expressed their intentions to rewrite the core to correct shortcomings, such as complicated configuration and scalability limitations in large deployments. The project signposted plans to write the Icinga 2 core mainly in C++, design a new component loader architecture, and remodel the process of executing monitoring checks.

In June 2014 the Icinga project released the first stable release of Icinga 2. New features, such as an agent or API feature, are scheduled for later releases.

Timeline of releases

Features 
Due to its nature as a fork, Icinga offers Nagios’ features with some additions such as optional reporting module with improved SLA accuracy, additional database connectors for PostgreSQL and Oracle, and distributed systems for redundant monitoring.

Icinga also maintains configuration and plug-in compatibility with Nagios, facilitating migration between the two monitoring software.

Monitoring 
 Monitoring of network services (SMTP, POP3, HTTP, NNTP, ping, etc.)
 Monitoring of host resources (CPU load, disk usage, etc.)
 Monitoring of server components (switches, routers, temperature and humidity sensors, etc.)
 Simple plug-in design that allows users to easily develop their own service checks
 Parallelized service checks
 Ability to define network host hierarchy using “parent” hosts, allowing detection of and distinction between hosts that are down and those that are unreachable
 Ability to define event handlers to be run during service or host events for proactive problem resolution

Notification 
 Notification of contact persons when service or host problems occur and get resolved (via email, pager, instant message, or user-defined method)
 Escalation of alerts to other users or communication channels

Visualisation & Reporting 
 Two optional user interfaces (Icinga Classic UI and Icinga Web) for visualization of host and service status, network maps, reports, logs, etc.
 Icinga Reporting module based on open source Jasper Reports for both Icinga Classic and Icinga Web user interfaces
 Template based reports (e.g. Top 10 problematic hosts or services, synopsis of complete monitoring environment, availability reports, etc.)
 Report repository with varying access levels and automated report generation and distribution
 Optional extension for SLA reporting that distinguishes between critical events from planned and unplanned downtime and acknowledgement periods
 Capacity utilization reporting
 Performance graphing via add-ons such as PNP4Nagios, NagiosGrapher and InGraph

Architecture 

Icinga Core is written in C and has a modular architecture with standalone core, user interface and database on which users can integrate various add-ons and plug-ins.

The latter communicates via Icinga's Doctrine abstraction layer, REST and plug-in APIs – that mediate between the external data and internal structures. This bundling of components allows users to distribute Icinga's system for redundant monitoring. It also offers users freedom to customize Icinga to suit their needs.

Icinga Core 
The Icinga Core manages monitoring tasks, receiving check results from various plug-ins. It then communicates these results to the IDODB (Icinga Data Out Database) through the IDOMOD (Icinga Data Out Module) interface and IDO2DB (Icinga Data Out to Database) service daemon over SSL encrypted TCP sockets. Though both come packaged (also known as IDOUtils) with the Core; they are single standing components, which can be separated to distribute the data and processes across multiple servers for distributed systems monitoring.

The Icinga Classic user interface also comes packaged with Icinga Core and can be used as a substitute to the PHP-based, Icinga Web interface

Icinga 2 
Icinga 2 manages monitoring tasks, running checks, sending alert notifications. The Icinga 2 features can be enabled on-demand, be it default features such as the 'checker' or 'notification' component, or external interfaces compatible with Icinga 1.x and its user interfaces, for example the IDO DB (Icinga Data Out Database). Icinga 2 ships a built-in cluster stack secured by SSL x509 certificates attempting to make distributed monitoring setups more easy.

The configuration syntax is different to Icinga Core 1.x and Nagios and requires a migration on upgrade.

Icinga's User Interface 
Icinga offers a web interface for users to view monitoring results and send commands to the Icinga Core, called Icinga Web (also referred to as New Web) is the project's Agavi and PHP based, Web 2.0 inspired front end that uses Cronks (widgets) to offer drag-n-drop customized dashboards. Icinga Web is a standalone piece of software. It communicates to the core, database and 3rd party add-ons through component layers: Doctrine abstraction layer (Input/Database), REST API (external scripts) and Command Control Interface (writing to pipe, executing commands).

The interface presents information on host and service status, history, notifications and status maps to show the health of a network in real-time and also supports IPv4 as well as IPv6 addresses.

Icinga Data Out Database 
The Icinga Data Out Database (IDODB) is a storage point for historical monitoring data for add-ons or the Icinga Web interface to access. In contrast to its predecessor Nagios, Icinga supports PostgreSQL and Oracle databases in addition to MySQL.

Icinga Reporting 
The Icinga project offers an optional Icinga Reporting module based on the open source Jasper Reports. It can be integrated into both Icinga Classic and Icinga Web user interfaces. The module provides template-based reports (e.g. Top 10 problematic hosts or services, synopsis of complete monitoring environment, availability reports etc.) that can be saved to a repository with varying access levels and automated report generation and distribution. Reports can also be viewed in both of Icinga's optional user interfaces.

Icinga Mobile 
Icinga Mobile is a user interface for smartphones and tablet browsers that run on WebKit. These usually are available on iOS, Android, BlackBerry Tablet OS and webOS. Based on JavaScript and Sencha Touch, Icinga Mobile is downloaded onto a server for access by authorized users via their mobile devices. Administration and updates can thus be made centrally, to automatically apply to all users of a computer network.

Extended functionality 

Icinga is compatible with all plug-ins and the majority of add-ons written for Nagios, especially for users opting for the Icinga Classic UI. Popular add-ons to extend Icinga's functionality include:

 Performance graphing (e.g. PNP4Nagios, NagiosGrapher, InGraph)
 Configuration interfaces and tools (e.g. Nconf (tool for configuring Nagios), NagiosQL, LConf)
 Business process monitoring (e.g. Business Process Addons)
 Network visualization (e.g. NagVis, Nagmap)
 Windows monitoring (e.g. NSClient++, Cygwin)
 SNMP trap monitoring (e.g. SNMPTT, NagTrap)

Large, enterprise environments 
Icinga has been successfully deployed in large and complex environments with thousands of hosts and services, in distributed and failover setups. The software's modular architecture with standalone Core, Web and IDODB (Icinga Data Out Database) facilitate distributed monitoring and distributed systems monitoring.

Nagios Remote Plugin Executor (NRPE) is an Icinga compatible agent that allows remote systems monitoring using scripts that are hosted on the remote systems. It allows for monitoring resources such as disk usage, system load or number of users currently logged in. Icinga periodically polls the agent on the remote system using the check_nrpe plug-in.

In setups using the optional Icinga Web user interface, monitoring data from multiple Icinga Core instances can be displayed as long as each instance writes to the same IDODB. In this way, distributed monitoring is also simpler to administer.

At a structural level, Icinga can have its various components split and scattered in a distributed set up. This distributed systems monitoring provides greater security and redundancy; if one component were to fail, another could take its place without disrupting the entire monitoring system.

The software also offers a fine-grained authentication system whereby user access, notifications and views can be customized to the detail of server groups, servers and services per individual.

See also 

 Comparison of network monitoring systems
 Nagios – the original software that Icinga forked from
 Shinken (software) – an Icinga compatible replacement
 Pandora FMS - An Icinga alternative
 Vigilo NMS - An Icinga alternative
 NetXMS - Used for monitoring entire IT infrastructures, starting with SNMP-capable hardware, ending with applications on servers

References

External links 
 
 dev.icinga.org , official development tracker and roadmap

Free network management software
Nagios
System monitors